Wallace & Gromit: The Curse of the Were-Rabbit is a video game developed by Frontier Developments and published by Konami. It was released for the PlayStation 2 and Xbox consoles, and for the Java ME. It was released in North America and Europe in September, October and December 2005 respectively, and in Japan on March 16, 2006 for the PlayStation 2. It is based on the film of the same name by Aardman Animations and DreamWorks Animation.

Gameplay
The main characters are Wallace and Gromit, whose new company, Anti-Pesto, is charged with keeping rabbits away from the upcoming Giant Vegetable Competition, which has been run by Lady Tottington's family at Tottington Hall for 517 years.

Cards must be collected to advance through the game. These can be obtained by completing tasks given by other characters, regaining the valves from Wallace's "Mind-O-Matic" machine that have been stolen by Lady Tottington's suitor, Victor Quartermaine, or by simply finding hidden cards. Residents of the game's various districts give tasks in exchange for cards.

The game is divided into four districts; The Town Centre, Wallersey the harbour area, Grimsley the industrial area and Tottington Hall. In each district there is at least one "arena", an area which Anti-Pesto must clear of pests. Arenas can be revisited at night, where Wallace is replaced by Hutch, who was originally a captive rabbit but swapped roles with Wallace after an accident with Wallace's invention, the Mind-O-Matic.

Wallace, Gromit, and Hutch each carry a primary pest-catching device, The BunGun. The BunGun is used to suck up pests and shoot them into a drain. Once in the drain, the pests are transported through the sewage system into Wallace and Gromit's basement, where they are kept captive. At nightfall, Gromit and Hutch can use the BunGun as a weapon to destroy were-creatures with a swing of the gun. Once dead, their "were energy" is stored in the BunGun, and can be used to destroy more creatures. The were energy can also be used to stun the Were-Rabbit.

Gromit can visit Mr. Caliche's shop, where he can purchase items to help grow the marrow that he's preparing for the Giant Vegetable Competition.

During the night, the Were-Rabbit tends to appear at random. Gromit and Hutch must chase it down and try and stop it from escaping. However, at the end of each chase, the Were-Rabbit hops over a barbed-wire fence which Wallace/Hutch and Gromit can't get over until it is opened.

As the duo progress through the game, a fortune teller, Madame Winnie Bago, who befriended Wallace and Gromit after they fixed her van, offers them tips and hints to help them complete tasks successfully.

At the end of the game, if the player has grown Gromit's marrow to its full potential, a post credits sequence plays where Lady Tottington visits Wallace & Gromit's house and awards Gromit The Golden Carrot.

Development
A port for mobile phones running Java ME was published by Player X.

Reception

Wallace & Gromit: The Curse of the Were-Rabbit received "average" reviews according to the review aggregation website Metacritic. In Japan, Famitsu gave the PlayStation 2 version a score of three sixes and one eight for a total of 26 out of 40.

References

External links
 

2005 video games
3D platform games
Multiplayer and single-player video games
Curse of the Were-Rabbit
Xbox games
J2ME games
Konami games
PlayStation 2 games
Frontier Developments games
Video games based on films
Video games about rabbits and hares
Video games set in Lancashire
Video games scored by Christopher Mann
Open-world video games
Video games developed in the United Kingdom